Julius or Jules Conus  (Yuly Eduardovich Konyus; 1 February 1869  3 January 1942) was a Russian violinist and composer.

Conus was born in Moscow, the son of the pianist Eduard Conus. His brothers were the musicians Georgi Conus and Lev Conus. All three brothers studied in the Moscow Conservatory;  among their teachers were Sergei Taneyev and Anton Arensky. Following the Russian Revolution he emigrated to France, where his son, Serge Conus, was born. Another of his sons, Boris, married the daughter of Sergei Rachmaninoff. Julius Conus returned to Moscow in 1939, dying there in 1942. His compositions include a concerto for violin which has been recorded by, among others, Jascha Heifetz.

Notes

External links 
 

1869 births
1942 deaths
19th-century classical composers
19th-century classical violinists
19th-century male musicians
19th-century musicians
19th-century musicians from the Russian Empire
20th-century classical composers
20th-century classical violinists
20th-century Russian male musicians
Classical violinists from the Russian Empire
Composers from the Russian Empire
Male classical violinists
Musicians from Moscow
Pupils of Sergei Taneyev
Russian classical violinists
Russian male classical composers
Russian people of French descent
Russian Romantic composers